Allington may refer to:

Places in England
 Allington, Dorset
 Allington, Hampshire
 Allington, Kent
 Allington, Lincolnshire
 Allington, Kennet, Wiltshire, near Devizes
 Allington, North Wiltshire, near Chippenham
 Allington, Salisbury, Wiltshire
 East Allington, Devon

People
 Bill Allington (1903–1966), American baseball player
 Edward Allington (1951–2017), English artist and sculptor
 Richard Allington, American academic

Other uses
 HMS Allington Castle, a 1944 Royal Navy corvette
 Allington Pippin, an apple cultivar
 The Small House at Allington, an 1864 novel by Anthony Trollope

See also
 Alington (disambiguation)